The Belize national cricket team represents the country of Belize in international cricket. The team is organised by the Belize National Cricket Association, which has been an affiliate member of the International Cricket Council (ICC) since 1997 and an associate member since 2017. A team representing British Honduras had debuted in 1960, when England visited after its 1959–60 tour of the West Indies. Belize's first international tournament was a qualifier for the 2004 ICC Americas Championship, and the team has competed regularly in ICC Americas tournaments since then.

In April 2018, the ICC decided to grant full Twenty20 International (T20I) status to all its members. Therefore, all Twenty20 matches played between Belize and other ICC members after 1 January 2019 will be a full T20I.

History

Belize became an affiliate member of the ICC in 1997. Their first international match after affiliating was played against Suriname on 23 March 2004, in the 2004 Americas Affiliate Tournament – a match which they won.

In 2006, they hosted the first ever Central American Cricket Championship, where they won the tournament that also featured Costa Rica and Mexico. Later in the year, they played in the second division of the ICC Americas Championship, finishing fifth of five teams. As a result, they were relegated to 2008 Division Three.

Belize were intended to play in the 2007 Central American Cricket Championship, but pulled out at the last minute giving El Salvador the chance to participate.

In the 2008 Division Three tournament, although they were favourites to win, Belize finished third of five teams. Later that year, they took part in the 2nd Easter Cup held in El Salvador. Belize beat Costa Rica and Mexico to finish in first place in the Twenty20 competition.

Belize took part in the 2009 Central American Championship, finishing third of five teams. They were beaten by close rivals Mexico in the new Twenty20 format of the competition.

At the 2011 Americas Twenty20 Division Two tournament, held in Suriname in April 2011, Belize were coached by Barbadian Wendell Coppin, who was funded by ICC Americas.

2018-Present

In April 2018, the ICC decided to grant full Twenty20 International (T20I) status to all its members. Therefore, all Twenty20 matches played between Belize and other ICC members after 1 January 2019 will be a full T20I.

In September 2018, Belize took part in 2018–19 ICC T20 World Cup Americas Qualifier, finished on 4th place.

Belize played their first ever Twenty20 International match against Mexico in 2019 Central American Cricket Championship.

In April 2019, Belize won 2019 Central American Cricket Championship, after beating MCC by 5 wickets in final.

Tournament history

ICC T20 World Cup Americas Qualifier
2018-19-:4th place (Northern Sub Region)

ICC Americas Championship
2000–2004: Did not participate
2006: 5th place (Division Two)
2008: 3rd place (Division Three)

Central American Championship
2006: Winners
2007: Did not participate
2009: 3rd place
2015: Did not participate
2019: Winners

Easter Cup
Mar 2008: Did not participate
Dec 2008: Winners

Players
Belize's squad for  2019 Central American Cricket Championship from 25–28 April 2019.
 Kenton Young (c)
 Aaron Arnold
 Andrew Banner
 Garrett Banner Jr.
 Glenford Banner
 Herbert Banner
 Ian Broaster
 Keenan Flowers
 George Hyde
 Gareth Joseph
 Aaron Muslar
 Glenroy Reynold
 Kenroy Reynolds
 Bernan Stephenson
 Travis Stephenson

Records

International Match Summary — Belize
 
Last updated 13 November 2021

Twenty20 International 

 Highest team total: 157/5 v Panama on 26 April 2019 at Reforma Athletic Club, Naucalpan
 Highest individual score: 69, Bernan Stephenson v Panama on 8 November 2021 at Coolidge Cricket Ground, Antigua
 Best bowling figures in an innings: 3/18, Aaron Muslar v Panama on 26 April 2019 at Reforma Athletic Club, Naucalpan

Most T20I runs for Belize

Most T20I wickets for Belize

T20I record versus other nations

Records complete to T20I #1424. Last updated 13 November 2021.

See also
 List of Belize Twenty20 International cricketers

References

Cricket in Belize
National cricket teams
Cricket
Belize in international cricket